Piletocera albipictalis is a moth in the family Crambidae. It was described by George Hampson in 1907. It is found in the Solomon Islands, where it has been recorded from Bougainville Island.

References

albipictalis
Moths described in 1907
Taxa named by George Hampson
Moths of Oceania